The Victory Trophy is the Canadian Senior Division II Field Lacrosse Championship of Canada.  The championship is held by the Canadian Lacrosse Association and features men's teams from across Canada.

Champions

1985 Manitoba
1986 Manitoba
1987 Edmonton
1988 South Fraser
1989 Calgary
1990 No Champion
1991 Oshawa
1992 Vancouver
1993 Edmonton
1994 Vancouver
1995 Manitoba
1996 Alberta
1997 Victoria
1998 Saskatchewan
1999 Wakefield
2000 Saskatchewan
2001 Saskatchewan
2002 Saskatchewan
2003 Saskatchewan
2004 Saskatchewan
2005 Molly Bloom
2006 Tri-City
2007 Ladner Pioneers
2008 Black Sheep
2009 Burlington Lakers
2010 Toronto Maple Leafs
2011 Calgary Raiders
2012 Edmonton
2013 Centre Wellington

External links
Victory Trophy webpage. CLA website

Lacrosse competitions in Canada
Canadian sports trophies and awards